The Benilde Blazers basketball program represents De La Salle–College of Saint Benilde (CSB) in men's basketball as a member of the National Collegiate Athletic Association (Philippines) (NCAA). The Benilde Blazers joined the NCAA in 1998, having been a fixture in the National Capital Region Athletic Association,  The Blazers notably won its first and only NCAA title in 2000 under probation.

History

Champions under probation 
The Blazers joined the NCAA in 1998. Two years later, they won the championship vs. the San Sebastian Stags, while under probation. The Blazers won just days after their brother team De La Salle Green Archers won the UAAP championship. The Blazers, under the leadership of players such as Mark Magsumbol and Sunday Salvacion developed a rivalry with the Stags, whom they met again the Finals two years later; this time, the Stags won. Dong Vergeire coached the Blazers during this time.

Playoff drought 
After this run of qualifying to the playoffs, the Blazers have not made it to this stage of the tournament since. From 2005 until 2007, they were coached by former Benilde player Caloy Garcia; he led them to three consecutive losing seasons. Gee Abanilla and Richard del Rosario next coached the team for the next four years, with the team missing the playoffs on all instances, with Del Rosario resigning in 2012. With new coach Gabby Velasco, the Blazers avoided last place in 2013, then narrowly missed the playoffs in 2014. The next year, the Blazers endured a 17-game losing streak, only to win on their last game, finishing last. Velasco resigned and was replaced by TY Tang. Tang led the Blazers to fifth place finishes in his second and third year of coaching the team, but migrated to Canada during the COVID-19 pandemic.

In 2022, the Blazers appointed Charles Tiu to coach the team. In his first year in NCAA Season 97 would be closest they've gotten to make it to the playoffs where they finished fourth after the elimination round, but due to COVID-19 restrictions, each team met the other teams only once, and a play-in tournament was done in lieu of the second round. It was in the play-in tournament where the Blazers were eliminated.

Current roster
NCAA Season 98

Head coaches 

 1998–2000: Bong Go
 2000–2003: Dong Vergeire
 2004–2005: Tonichi Yturri 
 2005–2007: Caloy Garcia
 2008: Gee Abanilla
 2009–2012: Richard del Rosario
 2013–2016: Gabby Velasco
 2017–2021: TY Tang
 2021–present: Charles Tiu

Season-by-season records

Honors 

 Championships:
 NCAA (1): 2000

Notes

References 

National Collegiate Athletic Association (Philippines) basketball teams